"Stone Love" is a 1987 song written and performed by Kool & the Gang, issued as the second single from the band's 1986 album Forever. The song peaked at number 10 on the Billboard Hot 100 in April 1987, becoming the band's final Top 10 single, and also their final top 40 to date.

Charts

Year-end charts

References

External links
 

1986 songs
1987 singles
Kool & the Gang songs
Mercury Records singles
PolyGram singles
Song recordings produced by Ronald Bell (musician)
Songs written by James "J.T." Taylor
Songs written by Ronald Bell (musician)
Songs written by Claydes Charles Smith
Songs written by Robert "Kool" Bell